The Ligue de Baseball Junior Élite du Québec (LBJEQ) is the top-level amateur summer baseball league in the Canadian province of Quebec. It is composed entirely of junior elite players - the best baseball players in the province under 22 years of age.

History
The league began as the Ligue de Baseball Royale junior, founded in 1948 by Gérard Thibault. In 1995 the league, now known as the Ligue de baseball Montréal Junior Élite merged with the eastern Quebec based Ligue Junior Majeure du Québec. Two years later the league assumed its current name.

Teams

Champions

Former teams

See also
Baseball awards#Canada
Ligue de Baseball Senior Élite du Québec

References

External links
LBEQ.com

Summer baseball leagues
2
1948 establishments in Quebec
Sports leagues established in 1948